Prasat Ban Thanon Hak otherwise known as Prasat Thanon Hak is a small ruined building located in Ban Thanon Hak, Ban Mai Subdistrict, Nong Bun Mak District, Nakhon Ratchasima Province.

It is a Khmer Hindu temple built in the 11th century. It faces east and comprises five structures encircled by a wall and baray (moat). At the east wall is the gopura (entrance arch) is the same as the exit on the other side. The lintels and sculptured stone slabs are made of sandstone and bronze, with dark brown-black Khmer lacquerware.

The temple is believed was built to perform rituals in Vaishnavism sect of Brahmanism or Hinduism.

Its location is a rectangular ditch-like path and there is a mound in the centre called Non Yai Chi. Hence the name "Thanon Hak" (directly translates as "broken path").

Laterite is the main material used for the construction. Gold ornaments, bronze and stone statues as well as brown glazed ceramics were unearthed. In 2017, a gold ring set with a translucent blue quartz in perfect condition aged around the early 11th century, was also discovered here.

References 

Angkorian sites in Thailand
Buildings and structures in Nakhon Ratchasima province
Archaeological sites in Thailand
Unregistered ancient monuments in Thailand